Jeff Littlejohn (born February 14, 1983) is former American football defensive lineman who played in the Arena Football League (AFL) for the San Jose SaberCats, Jacksonville Sharks and Georgia Force.

Littlejohn played football at Middle Tennessee State University through the year 2005. He was not selected in the 2006 NFL Draft; as such, he signed with the San Jose SaberCats of the Arena Football League in November 2006. Littlejohn saw little action as a rookie; despite this, he won his first championship when the SaberCats defeated the Columbus Destroyers in ArenaBowl XXI.

Littlejohn did not record any statistics in 2008. In 2009, the Arena Football League ceased operations; when it returned in 2010, Littlejohn signed with the expansion Jacksonville Sharks. Littlejohn saw significant playing time in 2010; he responded by recording five sacks and three fumble recoveries in 13 regular season games. In 2011, he joined the AFL's Georgia Force; there, he tallied four sacks and one fumble recovery in 12 regular season games. Littlejohn remained with the Force into 2012; halfway through the season, however, he was placed on reassignment by the team. Littlejohn was then assigned to the Sharks, where he finished the season.

References

External links
ArenaFan statistics

Living people
1983 births
Players of American football from South Carolina
American football defensive linemen
African-American players of American football
Middle Tennessee Blue Raiders football players
San Jose SaberCats players
Jacksonville Sharks players
Georgia Force players
People from Gaffney, South Carolina
21st-century African-American sportspeople
20th-century African-American people